Academician Koptyug Avenue or Academician Koptyug Prospekt is a street in the Akademgorodok of Novosibirsk, Russia. The avenue runs from Academician Lavrentyev Avenue and ends at the intersection with Tereshkova Street and Universitetsky Avenue. The street is named after Valentin Koptyug.

Research organizations

Siberian Branch of the Russian Academy of Sciences
 Institute of Cytology and Genetics
 Institute of Automation and Electrometry
 Sobolev Institute of Mathematics
 Trofimuk Institute of Petroleum-Gas Geology and Geophysics
 Sobolev Institute of Geology and Mineralogy
 Geophysical Survey RAS (GS RAS)

Other research organizations
 Russian Geographical Society

Companies
 ICiG-Plus is a company selling domesticated red fox bred in the Institute of Cytology and Genetics.
 Novosoft. IT-company based in 1990s.
 SoftLab-NSK is a Soviet and Russian company based in 1988. The company develops computer games, virtual simulators for astronauts, railway workers, etc.

Gallery

References

External links
 В новосибирском Академгородке появилось второе граффити про одомашненных лисиц. Комсомольская Правда.

Streets in Novosibirsk
Sovetsky District, Novosibirsk